This was the first edition of the tournament.

Georgina García Pérez and Fanny Stollár won the title, defeating Nina Potočnik and Nika Radišič in the final, 6–1, 7–6(7–4).

Seeds

Draw

Draw

References
Main Draw

Kiskút Open II - Doubles